Millbrook is an unincorporated community in Hampshire County, West Virginia, United States. Millbrook is located along Dillons Run on Dillons Run Road (West Virginia Secondary Route 50/25) in southeastern Hampshire County.

References 

Unincorporated communities in Hampshire County, West Virginia
Unincorporated communities in West Virginia